Gigaspermum is a genus of moss in the family Gigaspermaceae. It contains four species.

Species

The genus Gigaspermum contains four species.

Gigaspermum breutelii 
Gigaspermum mouretii 
Gigaspermum repens 
Gigaspermum tumidum

References

Moss genera
Gigaspermales